Scott Metzger (born October 12, 1977) is an American guitarist. His work touches on many styles including psychedelic rock, soul, country, jazz, and surf rock. His collaborations with other artists include Phil Lesh, John Scofield, Joe Russo, John Mayer, Oteil Burbridge, Warren Haynes, Shooter Jennings, LaLa Brooks of The Crystals, Trixie Whitley, Nicole Atkins, Anders Osborne, Dean Ween, Mark Richler, Circles Around the Sun, the Stanton Moore trio, and Umphrey's McGee. Metzger is a full-time member of Joe Russo's Almost Dead since its inception in 2013; he also continues to play with other artists.

Biography 
Metzger was born in Trenton, New Jersey and began playing guitar in his teens. He was raised in Lambertville, New Jersey & attended the prestigious jazz program at William Paterson University.

He has performed at music festivals worldwide, including the Montreux Jazz Festival (Switzerland), Newport Folk Festival, Lockn' Festival, the New Orleans Jazz & Heritage Festival, Bonaroo, and OUR Fest as well as famous and historic venues worldwide; Carnegie Hall, The Fillmore in San Francisco, Ancienne Belgique (Brussels, Belgium), The Blue Note (New York,) Ryman Auditorium, Red Rocks Amphitheatre, Fox Theatre Oakland, Lincoln Center, and the Capitol Theatre.

References
Scott sits down with Ira Haberman of The Sound Podcast for a feature interview

1977 births
Living people
People from Lambertville, New Jersey
Musicians from Trenton, New Jersey
Guitarists from New Jersey
21st-century American guitarists
Joe Russo's Almost Dead members
American Babies members